The Charles Noden George House is a historic house in rural Graham County, North Carolina. It is a single-pen log structure built c. 1853, which faces east at the top of a  pasture and overgrown orchard. The logs are poplar, and are joined by half-dovetail notches. A fieldstone chimney rises from the uphill side of the structure, and there is a kitchen ell and a wraparound porch on the south and west sides, added c. 1900. It was built by a veteran of the War of 1812 during the second major wave of development in western North Carolina.

The house was listed on the National Register of Historic Places in 1984.

See also
National Register of Historic Places listings in Graham County, North Carolina

References

Houses on the National Register of Historic Places in North Carolina
Houses completed in 1853
Houses in Graham County, North Carolina
National Register of Historic Places in Graham County, North Carolina